Lycée Corneille may refer to:
 Lycée Corneille (La Celle-Saint-Cloud)
 Lycée Corneille (Rouen)